Orthonops zebra is a species of true spider in the family Caponiidae. It is found in the United States.

References

Caponiidae
Articles created by Qbugbot
Spiders described in 1995